Lip Sing Battle is an Indian musical reality competition television series produced by South Africa's Red Pepper TV which was premiered on 16 September 2017, on Star Plus and continued till 5 November 2017. The show is based on Lip Sync Battle. The show was hosted by Farah Khan and Ali Asgar.

Concept 
Popular celebrities compete against one another and perform the best lip sync of famous songs with the help of props and costumes.

See also 
 Lip Sync Battle

References

External links
 Lip Sing Battle Streaming on Hotstar
 

Hindi-language television shows
Indian reality television series
Indian music television series
2017 Indian television series debuts
StarPlus original programming
Indian television series based on American television series